Six60 is the second studio album released by New Zealand rock band Six60. It was released on 27 February 2015 through New Zealand label Massive Entertainment. It debuted at number one on the New Zealand Albums Chart and was certified Gold in its first week. All of the songs on the album made an appearance on the New Zealand Artists Singles Chart in its first week of release due to strong overall sales. The album was later released in a Standard edition or a Deluxe edition with additional tracks.

Singles
 "Special" was released as the album's lead single on 10 November 2014. It debuted and peaked at number one on the New Zealand Singles Chart and was certified 2× Platinum by Recorded Music NZ.
 "So High" was originally released as a promotional single on 22 December 2014. It was promoted to radio and released as the second official single on 27 February 2015 to accompany the release of the album. The song peaked at number ten on the New Zealand Singles Chart, and was later certified Platinum.
 "White Lines" was released as the third single from the album on 4 May 2015. The song peaked at number five on the New Zealand Singles Chart, and has been certified Platinum.

Other songs
 "Purple", despite not being released as an official single or making an appearance on the national singles chart, has reached number three on the New Zealand Artist Singles Chart and has been certified Gold by Recorded Music NZ.
 "Stay Together"
 "Exhale"

Track listing

Charts

Weekly charts

Year-end charts

Release history

References

2015 albums
Six60 albums